ChuckleVision is a British television entertainment programme starring The Chuckle Brothers.

Episodes

Series 1 (1987) 

This series was released onto DVD in October 2011. It was rereleased in July 2016.

Series 2 (1988–1989) 

This series was released onto DVD in October 2012. It was rereleased in August 2016.

Series 3 (1989–1990) 

Episode 11, "Hotel Hostilities", was the first appearance of "No Slacking", a character played by Paul and Barry's real life brother Jimmy Patton of the Patton Brothers. 
This series was released onto DVD in April 2017.

Series 4 (1991)

Series 5 (1992–1993)

Series 6 (1994)

Series 7 (1995) 

 Episode 2, "The Hunt for Chalky White" was the first appearance of "Getoutofit" played by Paul and Barry's real life brother Brian Patton of the Patton Brothers.

Series 8 (1995–1996)

Series 9 (1996–1997)

Series 10 (1997–1998)

Series 11 (1998–1999)

Series 12 (1999–2000) 

These episodes were originally twenty minutes long, however in 2004 the BBC edited them down to 15 minutes.

Series 13 (2000–2001) 

^This episode is the only silent ChuckleVision episode in the entire series.These episodes were originally twenty minutes long, however in 2005 the BBC edited them down to 15 minutes.

Series 14 (2002)

2002 Christmas Specials

These two episodes were supposed to be shown back to back as a double bill on Christmas Eve 2002. Unfortunately, due to a mix up, "Messy Xmas" was shown twice by mistake. The CBBC Channel later played the double bill with the episodes in the correct order.

Series 15 (2003)

Series 16 (2004)

Series 17 (2005)

Series 18 (2006)

Series 19 (2007)

Series 20 (2008)

Christmas Special (2008)

Series 21 (2009)

References

External links 

ChuckleVision